is a Japanese voice actor affiliated with Aoni Production. He gained recognition for his role as Guel Jeturk in Mobile Suit Gundam: The Witch from Mercury.

Biography
Azakami was born in Gunma Prefecture on August 7, 1991. He attended Aoni Juku, the voice acting school of talent agency Aoni Production. He joined their agency in 2011 after graduating. Azakami initially performed under the stage name , until he changed it to Yōhei Azakami in 2012. He starred in his first lead role as Kennosuke Tokisada Ōma in the 2016 anime series Kuromukuro.

Filmography

Television animation
2012
 Gakkatsu! as Hiroshi-kun

2016
 Kuromukuro as Kennosuke Tokisada Ōma

2017
 Piacevole! as Kirihide Konno
 Classroom of the Elite as Masayoshi Hashimoto

2018
 The Seven Deadly Sins as Deathpierce

2019
 One Piece as Charlotte Raisin

2020
 Sakura Wars the Animation as Seijuro Kamiyama
 Plunderer as Genji Akui
 Get Up! Get Live! as Ren Kitami
 My Teen Romantic Comedy SNAFU Climax as Hatano

2021
 Godzilla Singular Point as Shunya Satō
 The Aquatope on White Sand as Kūya Yakamashi
 D_Cide Traumerei the Animation as Ryuuhei Oda
 Shinkansen Henkei Robo Shinkalion Z as Kannagi

2022
 Love All Play as Shо̄hei Sakaki
 Phantom of the Idol as Homare Hakata
 When Will Ayumu Make His Move? as Ayumu Tanaka
 The Prince of Tennis II: U-17 World Cup as Michael Bismarck
 Duel Masters Win as Prince Kaiser
 Mobile Suit Gundam: The Witch from Mercury as Guel Jeturk
 Bibliophile Princess as Irvin Olanza

2023
 Tsurune: The Linking Shot as Kenyū Ōtaguro
 Bungo Stray Dogs 4 as Tetchō Suehiro
 Flaglia as Tetsu

Original net animation
2019
 Kengan Ashura as Iwan Karaev

2020
 Ghost in the Shell: SAC_2045 as Sanji Yaguchi

2021
 Shabake as Sasuke
 Gundam Breaker Battlogue as Kentarō Mahara

2022
 Spriggan as Jean Jacquemonde

Anime films
2018
 Dragon Ball Super: Broly as Leek

2021
 Sailor Moon Eternal as Xenotime

2022
 The Seven Deadly Sins: Grudge of Edinburgh as Deathpierce

Video games
2015
 Touken Ranbu as Shizukagata Naginata

2016
 Ys VIII: Lacrimosa of Dana as Franz, Captain Reed
 Samurai Warriors: Spirit of Sanada as Sasuke

2018
 God Eater 3 as Player (Male)

2019
 Jump Force as Venoms
 The Seven Deadly Sins: Grand Cross as Holy Knight Deathpierce
 Sakura Wars as Seijuro Kamiyama
 Atelier Ryza: Ever Darkness & the Secret Hideout as Bos Brunnen

2020
 Atelier Ryza 2: Lost Legends & the Secret Fairy as Bos Brunnen
 Ensemble Stars!! as Rinne Amagi

2021
 Samurai Warriors 5 as Shikanosuke Yamanaka
 Tsukihime -A piece of blue glass moon- as Michael Roa Valdamjong
 Melty Blood: Type Lumina as Michael Roa Valdamjong
 Tokimeki Memorial: Girl's Side 4th Heart as Minoru Nanatsumori
 D_Cide Traumerei as Ryuuhei Oda

2022
 Digimon Survive as Ryou Tominaga

2023 
 Atelier Ryza 3: Alchemist of the End & the Secret Key as Bos Brunnen

Live-action television 

 Hinatazaka de Aimashō (2019–present), narrator

Dubbing 

 Eraser: Reborn (Mason Pollard (Dominic Sherwood))

References

External links
 Official agency profile 
 

1991 births
Aoni Production voice actors
Japanese male video game actors
Japanese male voice actors
Living people
Male voice actors from Gunma Prefecture